Ravenhall may refer to:
 Ravenhall, Victoria, outer suburban locality of Melbourne, Australia
 George E Ravenhall (1886–1977), Australian public servant
 John Ravenhall (born ca. 1941), Australian scouting leader